Chalkiades is a village in the south of the Larissa regional unit, Greece. It is part of the municipal unit of Polydamantas. In 2011 its population was 363. Chalkiades is located in the Thessalian Plain, 12 km north of Farsala and 27 km south of Larissa. The Greek National Road 3 passes through the village.

Population

History

Chalkiades consists of two settlements: Ano Chalkiades and Kato Chalkiades. Ano Chalkiades was founded by refugees who fled from Cappadocia during the Greco-Turkish War (1919–1922).

External links
 Chalkiades on GTP Travel Pages

References

Populated places in Larissa (regional unit)